γ Muscae, Latinised as Gamma Muscae, is a blue-white hued star in the southern circumpolar constellation of Musca, the Fly. It can be seen with the naked eye, having an apparent visual magnitude of 3.87. Based upon an annual parallax shift of 10.04 mas as seen from Earth, it is located about 325 light years from the Sun.

This is a B-type main-sequence star with a stellar classification of B5 V. It is a variable star that ranges between magnitudes 3.84 and 3.86 over a period of 2.7 days, and is classed as a slowly pulsating B star. It is around five times as massive as the Sun. The star is spinning rapidly with a projected rotational velocity of 205 km/s. This is giving it an oblate shape with an equatorial bulge that is 7% larger than the polar radius.

Gamma Muscae is a proper motion member of the Lower Centaurus–Crux sub-group in the Scorpius–Centaurus OB association, the nearest such association of co-moving massive stars to the Sun.

References

B-type main-sequence stars
Slowly pulsating B stars
Lower Centaurus Crux

Musca (constellation)
Muscae, Gamma
Durchmusterung objects
109026
061199
4773